We Can't Live Without Cosmos (Russian: Мы не можем жить без космоса, My ne mozhem zhit bez kosmosa) is a 2015 Russian animated short film directed and written by Konstantin Bronzit. It is produced by Alexander Boyarsky. The film received critical praise and wide recognition. It received many awards including a nomination for the Academy Award for Best Animated Short Film at the 88th Academy Awards.

Plot summary
Two lifelong friends  designated by the numbers 1203 and 1204  grow up with the shared dream of becoming cosmonauts. They easily pass the many physical tests they take during their cosmonaut training, and they even attempt to simulate the feel of flying through space by bouncing on their beds. They are ultimately selected for the next mission, with 1203 being launched solo and 1204 standing by as the reserve cosmonaut. The launch at first goes smoothly, but communication with the ship is soon lost; it is implied that 1203 dies in the vacuum of space. Inconsolable with grief, 1204 refuses to take off his spacesuit; an X-ray shows him curled up in a fetal position in the torso. Eventually, medical staff saw his helmet off, but find the suit empty except for a photo of the two friends in their spacesuits. They then look up to see a hole shaped like 1204's body in the ceiling above his bed, and 1204 is shown drifting suitless through space, where the still-suited 1203 grabs him by the arm.

Awards and nominations
 Academy Award for Best Animated Short Film  Nominated 
 Aspen Shortsfest Special Jury Prize  Won
 Animafest Zagreb Grand Prize Award  Won
 Annecy International Animated Film Festival  Feature Film  Won 
 Cape Cod International Film Festival  Best Animated Short Film  Won
 China International New Media Short Film Festival  KingBonn Award  Won
 Hiroshima International Animation Festival  Grand Pix  Nominated
 Imago Film Festival  Best of Show  Won
 Marcin Award  Best Youths' Short Movie  Won 
 Melbourne International Film Festival  Best Animated Short Film  Won (Alexander Boyarsky, Sergey Selyakov; Producers with Konstantin Bronzit)
 Nika Awards  Best Animated Film  Nominated
 Rhode Island International Film Festival  Grand Prize  Best Animation  Won  
 Tokyo Anime Award 
 Short Film Competition  Grand Prize  Won
 Short Film  Tokyo Metropolitan Governor Prize  Won 
 San Francisco International Film Festival  Golden Gate Award  Best Animated Short Film  Nominated
 Animation Show of Shows  Won

References

External links
 
 The Screening Room: “We Can’t Live Without Cosmos” at The New Yorker

Films about astronauts
Russian animated short films
2015 animated films
2015 films
2010s animated short films
Melnitsa Animation Studio animated films
2010s English-language films